Sun Luyu (died August or September 255), courtesy name Xiaohu, was an imperial princess of the state of Eastern Wu during the Three Kingdoms period of China. She was the younger daughter of Sun Quan, the founding emperor of Wu, and his concubine Bu Lianshi. She is also referred to as Princess Zhu (朱公主/朱主) because of her marriage to Zhu Ju.

Life
Sun Luyu was the younger daughter of Sun Quan, the founding emperor of Eastern Wu, and his concubine Bu Lianshi. She had an elder sister, Sun Luban. The sisters' courtesy names, Xiaohu (小虎) and Dahu (大虎), respectively mean "small tiger" and "big tiger". Sun Luyu initially married Zhu Ju, a general who briefly served as the fifth Imperial Chancellor of Wu. She and Zhu Ju had a daughter, who married Sun Quan's sixth son, Sun Xiu, who was also a half-brother of Sun Luyu.

In the 240s, a power struggle broke out between two of Sun Quan's sons – Sun He, the Crown Prince and Sun Ba, the Prince of Lu – with both of them fighting over the position of Crown Prince. The power struggle had a polarising effect on Sun Quan's subjects; two opposing factions, each supporting either Sun He or Sun Ba, emerged from among them. During this time, Sun Luyu's husband Zhu Ju supported Sun He, while Sun Luyu's sister Sun Luban and her husband Quan Cong sided with Sun Ba. When Sun Luban tried to get Sun Luyu to support Sun Ba, Sun Luyu refused and became estranged from her sister as a result.

In 250, the power struggle came to an end when Sun Quan forced Sun Ba to commit suicide and deposed Sun He from his position as Crown Prince. Many of the officials involved in the power struggle were executed, exiled or removed from office. Sun Luyu's husband, Zhu Ju, was demoted and reassigned to a new post in Xindu Commandery (新都郡; around present-day Chun'an County, Zhejiang). While Zhu Ju was en route to Xindu Commandery, Sun Hong (孫弘), one of Sun Ba's supporters, took advantage of Sun Quan's poor health to issue a fake imperial decree ordering Zhu Ju to commit suicide. Zhu Ju thought that the decree was genuine so he killed himself as ordered. The general Liu Zuan (劉纂) had previously married Sun Quan's second daughter (a half-sister of Sun Luban and Sun Luyu), but she died early, so Sun Quan arranged for him to marry the widowed Sun Luyu.

In August or September 255 during Sun Liang's reign, Sun Yi (孫儀) and others plotted to overthrow the regent Sun Jun, but were discovered and executed before they could carry out their plan. Sun Luban, who had a secret affair with Sun Jun after her husband Quan Cong died in 249, seized the opportunity to falsely accuse her estranged sister Sun Luyu of being involved in the plot. Sun Jun believed Sun Luban and had Sun Luyu arrested and executed. She was buried at Shizigang (石子崗; literally "stones hill"), a hill in present-day Yuhuatai District, Nanjing, Jiangsu.

Postmortem events
After Sun Jun died in 256, his cousin Sun Chen succeeded him as the regent for the Wu emperor Sun Liang. Sometime between 256 and 258, Sun Liang suspected that Sun Luban had something to do with Sun Luyu's death, so he summoned his half-sister and questioned her. A fearful Sun Luban lied to him, "I really don't know. I heard it from Zhu Ju's sons, Zhu Xiong (朱熊) and Zhu Sun (朱損)." Sun Liang thought that Zhu Xiong and Zhu Sun betrayed Sun Luyu to Sun Jun – especially since Zhu Sun married Sun Jun's younger sister – so he ordered Ding Feng to execute Zhu Xiong and Zhu Sun.

In 258, Sun Chen deposed Sun Liang and replaced him with Sun Xiu, Sun Quan's sixth son, as the third emperor of Wu. Sun Xiu's wife, Lady Zhu, was the daughter of Zhu Ju and Sun Luyu. On 18 January 259, Sun Xiu staged a coup d'état against the regent Sun Chen, succeeded in ousting him from power, and ordered Sun Chen and his entire family to be executed. Sun Xiu also had Sun Jun's dead body unearthed and stripped of the honours accorded to him, and posthumously rehabilitated the people who were executed during Sun Jun and Sun Chen's regencies. Sun Luyu was one of them.

Sometime between 6 November and 5 December 264, Sun Hao, the fourth emperor of Wu, ordered Sun Luyu's remains to be unearthed and reburied with honours befitting her status as a princess. The Soushen Ji recorded an account as follows:

See also
 Lists of people of the Three Kingdoms
 Eastern Wu family trees#Sun Quan

Notes

References

 Chen, Shou (3rd century). Records of the Three Kingdoms (Sanguozhi).
 Fang, Xuanling (648). Book of Jin (Jin Shu).
 Pei, Songzhi (5th century). Annotations to Records of the Three Kingdoms (Sanguozhi zhu).
 Sima, Guang (1084). Zizhi Tongjian.
 Xu, Song ( 8th century). Jiankang Shilu (建康實錄).

Year of birth unknown
255 deaths
Eastern Wu imperial princesses
Family of Sun Quan
People executed by Eastern Wu
Daughters of emperors